Brawith is a hamlet in the Hambleton District of North Yorkshire, England. It forms part of the civil parish of Knayton with Brawith.

Villages in North Yorkshire